Jacquin Desiree Strouss Lucena (born February 22, 1953) is the wife of the 29th president of Colombia, Ernesto Samper Pizano, and served as First Lady of Colombia from 1994 to 1998.

Personal life
Jacquin Desiree was born on 22 February 1953 to Herbert S. Strouss and María Inés Lucena. Her father was an American Special Forces pilot who perished in Laos during the Laotian Civil War when his aircraft was shot down while delivering supplies to American troops; she was 9 years old at the time. She attended Colegio Nueva Granada in Bogotá where she finished her primary studies, and later graduated from Colegio La Asunción. She is an alumnus of the Universidad de los Andes where she obtained a degree in Economics in 1976; she later obtain a master's degree in History at Univerdidad de los Andes.

She was single and married Ernesto Samper Pizano on 16 June 1979. Ernesto and Jacquin have two children: Felipe and Miguel.

References

1953 births
Living people
People from Medellín
Colombian people of American descent
Colombian people of German descent
Samper family
Colombian economists
Academic staff of Del Rosario University
Academic staff of the Pontifical Xavierian University
First ladies of Colombia